Juan Manuel Carranza Murillo  (born 9 May 1983) is a Salvadoran professional football coach.

References

1983 births
Living people
People from La Libertad Department (El Salvador)
Salvadoran footballers
Salvadoran football managers
Association footballers not categorized by position